The 1948 West Virginia Mountaineers football team was an American football team that represented West Virginia University as an independent during the 1948 college football season. In its first season under head coach Dudley DeGroot, the team compiled a 9–3 record and outscored opponents by a total of 257 to 140. The team played its home games at Mountaineer Field in Morgantown, West Virginia. Victor Bonfili, Russell Combs, and Frank Reno were the team captains.

Schedule

References

West Virginia
West Virginia Mountaineers football seasons
Sun Bowl champion seasons
West Virginia Mountaineers football